Mollepata or Mullipata (Quechua mulli Peruvian pepper tree pata elevated place / edge, bank (of a river), shore) is one of eight districts of the province Santiago de Chuco in Peru.

References

Districts of the Santiago de Chuco Province